Dillwynia ramosissima, commonly known as bushy parrot-pea, is a species of flowering plant in the family Fabaceae and is endemic to south-eastern continental Australia. It is a low-lying to erect shrub with linear to narrow oblong or spatula-shaped leaves and yellow flowers with red markings.

Description

Taxonomy and naming
Dillwynia ramosissima was first formally described in 1837 by George Bentham in Commentationes de Leguminosarum Generibus. The specific epithet (ramosissima) means "much-branched".

Distribution
This dillwynia grows in heath and forest south from the Cudgegong River in New South Wales and in central Victoria.

References

ramosissima
Flora of New South Wales
Flora of Victoria (Australia)
Plants described in 1837
Taxa named by George Bentham